San Severino can refer to:

Places in Italy
Mercato San Severino, a commune of the Province of Salerno
San Severino Lucano, a commune of the Province of Potenza
San Severino Marche, a commune in the Province of Macerata
San Severino (Centola), a hamlet of Centola in the Province of Salerno
Santi Severino e Sossio, Naples, a church in Central Naples, Italy

People
Severinus of Noricum, a Roman Catholic saint
Severin of Cologne, another saint

See also
Sanseverino
Severino